St. Mary's is a civil parish in County Westmeath, Ireland.

St. Mary's is one of 8 civil parishes in the barony of Fore in the Province of Leinster.

St. Mary's civil parish comprises 7 townlands: Aghalasty and Ankersland, Balnavine, Carrick, Christianstown, Cummerstown, Glenidan and Martinstown.

The neighbouring civil parishes are: Moylagh (County Meath) to the north, Delvin to the east, Clonarney to the east and south, Kilcumny to the south and St. Feighin's to the west.

References

External links
St. Mary's civil parish at the IreAtlas Townland Data Base
St. Mary's civil parish at townlands.ie
St. Mary's civil parish at The Placename Database of Ireland

Civil parishes of County Westmeath